Béhierite is a very rare mineral, a natural tantalum borate of the formula . Béhierite is also one of the most simple tantalum minerals. It contains simple tetrahedral borate anions, instead of more common among minerals, planar BO3 groups. It forms a solid solution with its niobium-analogue, schiavinatoite. Both have zircon-type structure (tetragonal, space group I41/amd) and are found in pegmatites. Béhierite and holtite are minerals with essential tantalum and boron.

Béhierite was named for  Jean Béhier (1903–1965), who discovered the mineral in 1959, as a French mineralogist, active in the Service Géologique, on the island of Madagascar.

Occurrence and association
Béhierite occurs in granitic pegmatites in Manjaka and Antsongombato, Madagascar. Associated minerals are albite, manganese-bearing apatite-group mineral, lepidolite, elbaite or elbaite–liddicoatite, feldspar, pollucite, quartz, rhodizite, and schiavinatoite.

Crystal structure
Crystal structure of synthetic TaBO4 was refined by Range et al. (1996). As béhierite is analogous to schiavinatoite, their crystal structures are expected to be similar.

References

Borate minerals
Tantalum minerals
Tetragonal minerals
Minerals in space group 141
Minerals described in 1959